Donald I.M. Brighouse (born 29 March 1993) is a Samoan rugby union player who plays for the New England Free Jacks in Major League Rugby (MLR). His position of choice is prop.

References 

Samoan rugby union players
1993 births
Living people
Otago rugby union players
Crusaders (rugby union) players
Rugby union players from Wellington City
Rugby union props
Samoa international rugby union players
Coventry R.F.C. players
Taranaki rugby union players
New England Free Jacks players